Glucose transporter 3 (or GLUT3), also known as solute carrier family 2, facilitated glucose transporter member 3 (SLC2A3) is a protein that in humans is encoded by the SLC2A3 gene. GLUT3 facilitates the transport of glucose across the plasma membranes of mammalian cells. GLUT3 is most known for its specific expression in neurons and has originally been designated as the neuronal GLUT. GLUT3 has been studied in other cell types with specific glucose requirements, including sperm, preimplantation embryos, circulating white blood cells and carcinoma cell lines.

Discovery

GLUT3 was the third glucose transporter to be discovered, first cloned in 1988 from a fetal skeletal muscle cell line, using a GLUT1 cDNA probe and shown to share 64.4% identity with GLUT1.

Function

Although GLUT3 was found to be expressed in various tissues, it is most specifically expressed in neurons, found predominantly in axons and dendrites and also, but less prominently, in the cell body. GLUT3 has at least a fivefold greater transport capacity than GLUT1 or GLUT4, as well as a higher glucose affinity than GLUT1, GLUT2 or GLUT4.  This is significant as glucose levels surrounding the neurons are only 1–2 mM, compared to 5–6 mM in the serum.

Brain

Glucose delivery and utilization in the mammalian brain is mediated primarily by a high molecular weight form of GLUT1 in the blood–brain barrier, GLUT3 in neuronal populations and a less glycosylated form of GLUT1 in the remainder of the parenchyma. GLUT3 is considered the main but not the exclusive neuronal glucose transporter, whereas other glucose transporters have also been observed in neurons.

GLUT3 expression in neurons in the rat coincides with maturation and synaptic connectivity and a positive correlation between protein levels of GLUT1, GLUT3 and regional cerebral glucose utilization was observed in mouse.

The central role of GLUT3 in cerebral metabolism has been challenged by the astrocyte-neuron lactate shuttle (ANLS) hypothesis, which proposes that astrocytes play the key role in the coupling of neuronal activity and cerebral glucose utilization. In this hypothesis, the astrocyte, which relies on GLUT1 for glucose transport, is the primary consumer of glucose in the brain, providing lactate as the primary energetic fuel for neurons. However, by modeling the kinetic characteristics and glucose concentrations in neurons and glia, it was concluded that the glucose capacity of neurons via GLUT3 far exceeds that of astrocytes via GLUT1. Additionally, demonstrations of increase in GLUT3 expression associated with increased cerebral glucose utilization provides further confirmation of the central role of GLUT3.

Other tissues

Expression of GLUT3 is also found in sperm, embryos, white blood cells and carcinoma cell lines.

Interactive pathway map

References

External links
 

Solute carrier family